In enzymology, an UDP-N-acetylmuramoylpentapeptide-lysine N6-alanyltransferase is an enzyme that catalyzes the chemical reaction

L-alanyl-tRNA + UDP-N-acetylmuramoyl-L-alanyl-D-glutamyl-L-lysyl-D-alanyl-D-alanine  tRNA + UDP-N-acetylmuramoyl-L-alanyl-D-glutamyl-N6-(L-alanyl)-L-lysyl-D- alanyl-D-alanine

Thus, the two substrates of this enzyme are L-alanyl-tRNA and UDP-N-acetylmuramoyl-L-alanyl-D-glutamyl-L-lysyl-D-alanyl-D-alanine, whereas its 3 products are tRNA, UDP-N-acetylmuramoyl-L-alanyl-D-glutamyl-N6-(L-alanyl)-L-lysyl-D-, and alanyl-D-alanine.

This enzyme belongs to the family of transferases, specifically the aminoacyltransferases.  The systematic name of this enzyme class is L-alanyl-tRNA:UDP-N-acetylmuramoyl-L-alanyl-D-glutamyl-L-lysyl-D-ala nyl-D-alanine N6-alanyltransferase. Other names in common use include alanyl-transfer ribonucleate-uridine, diphosphoacetylmuramoylpentapeptide transferase, UDP-N-acetylmuramoylpentapeptide lysine N6-alanyltransferase, uridine diphosphoacetylmuramoylpentapeptide lysine, N6-alanyltransferase, L-alanyl-tRNA:UDP-N-acetylmuramoyl-L-alanyl-D-glutamyl-L-lysyl-D-, and alanyl-D-alanine 6-N-alanyltransferase.  This enzyme participates in peptidoglycan biosynthesis.

Structural studies

References

 

EC 2.3.2
Enzymes of known structure